Moritz Benedikt also spelt Moriz (4 July 1835, in Eisenstadt, Sopron County – 14 April 1920, in Vienna) was a Hungarian-Austrian neurologist who was a native of Eisenstadt.

He was an instructor and professor of neurology at the University of Vienna. Benedikt was a physician with the Austrian army during the Second Italian War of Independence (1859) and the Austro-Prussian War.

Benedikt was a specialist in the fields of electrotherapeutics and neuropathology. His name is lent to the eponymous "Benedikt's syndrome", a disease characterized by ipsilateral oculomotor paralysis with contralateral tremor and hemiparesis caused by a lesion involving the red nucleus and corticospinal tract in the midbrain tegmentum.

Benedikt is remembered today for his controversial research in criminal anthropology. He performed numerous cephalometric studies, and postulated that there were specific differences between "normal" and "criminal brains". He explained his research on the subject in a book titled "Anatomical Studies upon the Brains of Criminals" (title of English translation).

Benedikt is credited for coining the word "darsonvalisation" to describe therapeutic or experimental applications of pulsed high frequency (110–400 kHz) high voltage (around 10–20 kV) current of a few mA. Darsonvalisation was named in honor of French biophysicist Jacques-Arsène d'Arsonval (1851–1940).

Benedikt also took an interest in dowsing (radiesthesia), writing two books on this subject Leitfaden der Rutenlehre (eng. Guideline to use of Divining Rods) and Ruten- und Pendellehre (eng. Instructions in Diving Rods and Pendulums)

Publications 
 Moriz Benedikt: Die psychologischen Funktionen des Gehirnes in gesundem und kranker Zustand, Wiener Klinik: Vorträge; Jg. 1, H. 7, Wien, 1875
 Moriz Benedikt: Zur Lehre von der Localisation der Gehirnfunctionen, Wiener Klinik: Vorträge; Jg. 9, H. 5-6, Vienna, 1875
 Moriz Benedikt: Ueber Katalepsie und Mesmerismus, Wiener Klinik: Vorträge; Jg. 6, H. 3/4, Vienna, 1880
 Moriz Benedikt: Ueber Elektricität in der Medicin, Wiener Klinik: Vorträge; Jg. 10, H. 2, Vienna, 1884
 Moriz Benedikt: Grundformeln des neuropathologischen Denkens, Wiener Klinik: Vorträge; Jg. 11, H. 4, Vienna, 1885
 Moriz Benedikt: Hypnotismus und Suggestion, Breitenstein, Leipzig, 1894
 Moriz Benedikt: Seelenkunde des Menschen als reine Erfahrungswissenschaft, Reisland, Leipzig, 1895
 Moriz Benedikt: Krystallisation und Morphogenesis, Perles, Vienna, 1904
 Moriz Benedikt: Aus meinem Leben: Erinnerungen und Erörterungen, Konegen, Vienna, 1906
 Moriz Benedikt: Biomechanik und Biogenesis, Jena, 1912
 Moriz Benedikt: Die latenten (Reichenbach'schen) Emanationen der Chemikalien, Konegen, Vienna, 1915
 Moriz Benedikt: Leitfaden der Rutenlehre (Wünschelrute), Urban & Schwarzenberg, Vienna, 1916; modern edition 
 Moriz Benedikt: Ruten- und Pendellehre, Vienna, 1917

Sources
  Moritz Benedikt’s Localization of Morality in the Occipital Lobes
 Short Biography of Moritz Benedikt
 Darsonvalisation @ Who Named It
 , Dr Moritz Benedikt, Verlagsbuchhandlung Carl Konegen, Vienna, 1906.

References 

1835 births
1920 deaths
19th-century Hungarian people
19th-century Austrian people
20th-century Austrian people
Austrian neurologists
Hungarian neurologists
Academic staff of the University of Vienna
Hungarian Jews
People from Eisenstadt